Wungazan Awangshi Shishak (born 1 January 1941) is an Indian Judge who became the Chief Justice of Chhattisgarh and Himachal Pradesh High Court.

Career
Shishak was born in 1941 at Shangshak village in Ukhrul district of the state of Manipur. He completed his graduation from Gauhati University in 1963. He passed LL.B. from Delhi University in 1965 and started practice in Gauhati High Court in 1967 and shifted to Nagaland in 1970. He served as a Senior Government Advocate for the Government of Nagaland for 7 years. He was the President of the Nagaland Bar Association. Shishak became Judge of Kohima Bench of the Gauhati High Court. On 4 December 2000 he was elevated to the post of the Chief Justice in Chhattisgarh High Court. He became the Chief Justice of Himachal Pradesh High Court on 24 January 2002. Justice Shishak retired on 1 January 2003.

References

1941 births
Living people
Delhi University alumni
People from Ukhrul district
Judges of the Gauhati High Court
Chief Justices of Chhattisgarh High Court
Chief Justices of the Himachal Pradesh High Court
20th-century Indian judges
20th-century Indian lawyers
21st-century Indian lawyers
21st-century Indian judges
Naga people